The Nineteen Martyrs of Capiz, more commonly known anachronistically as the Nineteen Martyrs of Aklan refers to a group of Filipino revolutionaries in Panay who were executed for advancing the cause of the Katipunan during the Philippine Revolution against Spain. All individuals were native to towns in Capiz, which are now in the modern province of Aklan.

Background
Former Filipino migrant workers Francisco del Castillo and Candido Iban won a lottery while there were in Australia. They returned to Manila in the Philippines in 1894 or 1895 to join the Katipunan, a revolutionary group seeking independence of the Philippines from Spain. They donated part of their winnings to help fund the a printing press that would be used for the publication of Kalayaan, the Katipunan's newspaper. The first issue was released in March 1896. 

The two were later directed by Andres Bonifacio to establish a chapter of the Katipunan in the Visayas. Del Castillo died in a fight on March 17, 1897 which led to the increase of pro-revolution sentiment in Capiz (in an area which now forms part of modern-day Aklan). The remaining revolutionaries were promised of amnesty by the Spanish colonial government but were imprisoned and tortured instead. They were executed on March 23, 1897.

Martyrs 
The Nineteen Martyrs of Aklan consists of natives of the modern-day Aklan province; nine hailed from Kalibo, four from Malinao, six from Lagatik (now New Washington).

Legacy
The nineteen martyrs are commemorated annually every March in the Kalibo in the modern-day province of Aklan. The Aklan Freedom Shrine was built in the town in their honor.

The martyrs were subject of a 2019 full-length documentary film titled Daan Patungong Tawaya. In the film, the martyrs were portrayed as having been empowered by anting-anting.

Notes

References

Paramilitary Filipinos
19 Martyrs of Aklan
People of Spanish colonial Philippines
1897 deaths
Executed Filipino people
People executed by Spain by firearm
History of the Philippines (1565–1898)
History of Aklan
History of Capiz
People from Aklan